Do Musafir is a 1978 Bollywood film directed by Devendra Goel. The film stars Shashi Kapoor and Rekha, along with Ashok Kumar, Pran & Prem Chopra. The music of the film was composed by Kalyanji-Anandji.

Cast
Ashok Kumar as Kailashnath 
Shashi Kapoor as Raju / Vicky 
Rekha as Bijli
Prem Chopra as Avinash Kumar 
Pran as Shambhu Chaudhary 
Jagdeep as Murli 
Meena T. as Bela 
Chandrashekhar as Girdhari  
Manorama as Maya (Bela's Aunty) 
Dulari as Bholi   
Shivraj as Bansi 
Chaman Puri as Bhavani Singh

Music
Kalyanji-Anandji have composed all songs from the film. The song "Hum Hain Pyar Ki Dagar Ke Do Musafir" by Mohammed Rafi and Lata Mangeshkar was a romantic and popular song, picturised on Shashi Kapoor and Rekha. Lyrics were written by Indeevar.

External links
 

1978 films
1970s Hindi-language films
Films scored by Kalyanji Anandji
Films directed by Devendra Goel